Thomas Taylor (29 January 1932 – 6 February 1958) was an English footballer, who was known for his aerial ability. He was one of the eight Manchester United players who died in the Munich air disaster.

Career

Taylor was born in Smithies, near Barnsley, Yorkshire, on 29 January 1932, one of six children born to Charles and Violet Taylor. He was a pupil at Raley Secondary Modern School, leaving in 1947. He began his football career playing for a team at the colliery where he worked. Two years later, he signed for Barnsley. He made his first-team debut at the age of 18 on 7 October 1950, in a 3–1 home win against Grimsby Town. In his next match, on 4 November 1950, he scored a hat-trick in a 7–0 victory against Queens Park Rangers. In all he scored seven goals in twelve appearances in 1950–51. While playing for Barnsley, he carried out national service in the British Army. It would not be long before Taylor was attracting the interest of First Division clubs.

After scoring 28 goals in 46 games for Barnsley, who had been unable to progress beyond the Second Division, Taylor was transferred to defending First Division champions Manchester United in March 1953 for the unusual fee of £29,999. Matt Busby did not want to burden the 21-year-old Taylor as being a "£30,000 player", so he took a £1 note from his wallet and handed it to the lady who had been serving tea during the negotiations. At the time, he was one of the most expensive players in British football and had also been subject of interest from clubs including Sheffield Wednesday, Derby County and Wolverhampton Wanderers.

He got off to a great start, scoring twice on his debut. By the end of the 1952–53 season, Taylor had scored seven goals in his first 11 games for United. He played a key role in United winning the First Division title 1955–56 and 1956–57 and scored in the 1957 FA Cup Final, when United were denied the Double as they lost 2–1 to Aston Villa (winners of the competition for a then record seventh time). He also helped United reach the semi-finals of the European Cup in the 1956–57 season, when they were the Football League's first entrants into Europe's premier club competition.

Such was Taylor's worth that Matt Busby decided to reject an offer of £65,000 for him from Internazionale in the summer of 1957. Had the deal gone through, it would have been one of the most expensive transfer fees in world football at the time.

At the time of his emergence, many saw Taylor as the perfect eventual replacement for Nat Lofthouse in the England side. In all, he played 19 times for England, scoring 16 goals. His first cap came on 17 May 1953 and a week later he found the net for the first time at senior international level in a 2–1 friendly win over Chile. He managed two hat-tricks for the England team, the first in a 5–2 win over Denmark on 5 December 1956, the second in a 5–1 win over Republic of Ireland on 8 May 1957. His last appearance for England came on 27 November 1957 against France, in which he scored twice in a 4–0 win.

Taylor died in the Munich air disaster, aged 26, on 6 February 1958. He had recently become engaged to his fiancée Carol.

He is buried at Monk Bretton Cemetery in his hometown Barnsley.

On 8 July 2011, a blue plaque was unveiled at 22 Greatstone Road in Stretford. This was a boarding house in the 1950s and Manchester United used it as lodgings for their unmarried players - particularly the ones whose families did not live locally. Taylor lived there with players including David Pegg and Mark Jones until these players were killed at Munich, by which time Jones had already married and left the house. A number of players who survived the crash or who were not on the plane also lodged at this house. The landlady was Margaret Watson.

The plaque is sponsored by Stretford High School (which is only 50 yards away) and came about as a result of a local history project undertaken by the pupils at the school. The plaque was unveiled by the cricket umpire Dickie Bird, who was at school with Taylor in Barnsley.

Career statistics

International goals
Scores and results list England's goal tally first. Score after each Taylor goal is shown in bold with asterisk.

Honours

Club
Manchester United
First Division: 1955–56, 1956–57
FA Charity: 1956, 1957

Individual
Football League 100 Legends: 1998 (inducted)

References

1932 births
1958 deaths
Footballers from South Yorkshire
English footballers
England international footballers
Barnsley F.C. players
Manchester United F.C. players
1954 FIFA World Cup players
English Football League players
English Football League representative players
Association football forwards
Footballers killed in the Munich air disaster
FA Cup Final players